Robert Lynn Batts (November 1, 1864 – May 19, 1935), known professionally as R. L. Batts, was a United States circuit judge of the United States Court of Appeals for the Fifth Circuit.

Education and career

Born in Bastrop, Texas, Batts received a Bachelor of Laws from the University of Texas School of Law in 1886 and entered private practice in Bastrop from 1886 to 1891. He was an assistant state attorney general of Texas from 1891 to 1893. He was then a professor of law at the University of Texas at Austin from 1893 to 1900. He was in private practice in Austin, Texas from 1900 to 1917.

Federal judicial service

Batts was nominated by President Woodrow Wilson on January 17, 1917, to a seat on the United States Court of Appeals for the Fifth Circuit vacated by Judge Andrew Phelps McCormick. He was confirmed by the United States Senate on February 5, 1917, and received his commission the same day. Batts resigned on August 22, 1919.

Post judicial service and death
Batts was general counsel to Gulf Oil from 1919 to 1923. He returned to private practice in Austin from 1924 to 1935. He died on May 19, 1935.

Selected published work 

   (print book);  (print book);  (online);  (online)
   (print book);  (print book);  (online);  (online)

Bibliography

Notes

References 

 
 

1864 births
1935 deaths
Judges of the United States Court of Appeals for the Fifth Circuit
United States court of appeals judges appointed by Woodrow Wilson
20th-century American judges
People from Bastrop, Texas